MindFreedom International is an international coalition of over one hundred grassroots groups and thousands of individual members from fourteen nations. Based in the United States, it was founded in 1990 to advocate against forced medication, medical restraints, and involuntary electroconvulsive therapy. Its stated mission is to protect the rights of people who have been labeled with psychiatric disorders. Membership is open to anyone who supports human rights, including mental health professionals, advocates, activists, and family members. MindFreedom has been recognized by the United Nations Economic and Social Council as a human rights NGO with Consultative Roster Status.

Origins and purpose

MindFreedom International is rooted in the psychiatric survivors movement, which arose out of the civil rights ferment of the late 1960s and early 1970s and the personal histories of psychiatric abuse experienced by some ex-patients rather than the intradisciplinary discourse of antipsychiatry. The precursors of MFI include ex-patient groups of the 1970s such as the Portland, Oregon-based Insane Liberation Front and the Mental Patients' Liberation Front in New York. The key text in the intellectual development of the survivor movement, at least in the US, was Judi Chamberlin's 1978 text, On Our Own: Patient Controlled Alternatives to the Mental Health System. Chamberlin was an ex-patient and co-founder of the Mental Patients' Liberation Front. Coalescing around the ex-patient newsletter Dendron, in late 1988 leaders from several of the main national and grassroots psychiatric survivor groups felt that an independent, human rights coalition focused on problems in the mental health system was needed. That year the Support Coalition International (SCI) was formed. In 2005 the SCI changed its name to MFI with David W. Oaks as its director. SCI's first public action was to stage a counter-conference and protest in May 1990 in New York City at the same time as (and directly outside of) the American Psychiatric Association's annual meeting.

Many of the members of MFI, who feel that their human rights were violated by the mental health system, refer to themselves as 'psychiatric survivors'. MFI is a contemporary and active coalition of grassroots groups which are carrying forward the historical tradition of survivor opposition to coercive psychiatry. It does not define itself as an antipsychiatry organization and its members point to the role which 'compassionate' psychiatrists have played in MFI. Activists within the coalition have been drawn from both left and right wing of politics.

MFI functions as a forum for its thousands of members to express their views and experiences, to form support networks and to organize activist campaigns in support of human rights in psychiatry. The coalition regards the psychiatric practices of 'unscientific labeling, forced drugging, solitary confinement, restraints, involuntary commitment, electroshock' as human rights violations.

In 2003, eight Mindfreedom members, led by then-executive director David Oaks, went on a hunger strike to publicize a series of "challenges" they had put forth to the American Psychiatric Association (APA), the US Surgeon General and the National Alliance on Mental Illness (NAMI). The eight MFI members challenged the APA, US Surgeon General and NAMI to present MFI with "unambiguous proof that mental illness is brain disorder." By sustaining the hunger-strike for more than one month, MFI forced the APA and NAMI to enter into a debate with them on this and other issues.

MindFreedom describes their Shield Program as "an all for one and one for all" network of members.  When a registered member is receiving (or is being considered for) involuntary psychiatric treatment, an alert is sent to the MindFreedom Solidarity Network on that person's behalf. Members of the network are then expected to participate in organized, constructive, nonviolent actions—e.g., political action, publicity and media alerts, passive resistance, etc.—to stop or prevent the forced treatment.

See also

 Anti-psychiatry
 Biopsychiatry controversy
 Clifford Whittingham Beers
 Electroconvulsive therapy
 Elizabeth Packard
 Icarus Project
 Involuntary commitment
 Involuntary treatment
 John Hunt
 Judi Chamberlin
 Kate Millett
 Leonard Roy Frank
 Linda Andre
 List of psychiatric survivor related topics
 Lyn Duff
 Mad Pride
 Mentalism (discrimination)
 National Empowerment Center
 Psychiatric survivors movement
 Recovery model
 Self-help groups for mental health
 Services for mental disorders
 Ted Chabasinski
 Peter Lehmann
 World Network of Users and Survivors of Psychiatry

References

External links
 MindFreedom.org - MindFreedom International homepage

Literature
 Oaks, David W. (2007). ‘MindFreedom International: Activism for Human Rights as the Basis for a Nonviolent Revolution in the Mental Health System’. In Peter Stastny & Peter Lehmann (Eds.), Alternatives Beyond Psychiatry (pp. 328–336). Berlin / Eugene / Shrewsbury: Peter Lehmann Publishing.  (UK),  (USA). E-Book in 2018.
 Oaks, David W. (2007). ‘MindFreedom International – Engagement für Menschenrechte als Grundlage einer gewaltfreien Revolution im psychosozialen System’. In: Peter Lehmann & Peter Stastny (Hg.), Statt Psychiatrie 2 (S. 344-352). Berlin / Eugene / Shrewsbury: Antipsychiatrieverlag. . E-Book in 2018.
 Taylor, Dan (2007). ‘MindFreedom Ghana: Fighting for Basic Human Conditions of Psychiatric Patients’. In Peter Stastny & Peter Lehmann (Eds.), Alternatives Beyond Psychiatry (pp. 336–342). Berlin / Eugene / Shrewsbury: Peter Lehmann Publishing.  (UK),  (USA). E-Book in 2018.
 Taylor, Dan (2007). ‘MindFreedom Ghana – Unser Kampf um humane Lebensbedingungen für Psychiatriebetroffene’. In: Peter Lehmann & Peter Stastny (Hg.), Statt Psychiatrie 2 (S. 352-358). Berlin / Eugene / Shrewsbury: Antipsychiatrieverlag. . E-Book in 2018.

Organizations established in 1988
International human rights organizations
Civil disobedience
Health and disability rights organizations in the United States
Mental health organizations in Oregon
Anti-psychiatry
Psychiatric survivor activists
Organizations based in Eugene, Oregon